The Federation of Autonomous Trade Unions of Ivory Coast (FESACI) is a trade union federation in Ivory Coast.

It was founded in 1992, and has a membership of 30 affiliated trade unions.

References

Trade unions in Ivory Coast
Trade unions established in 1992